Tinthia is a genus of moths in the family Sesiidae.

Species
Tinthia beijingana Yang, 1977:120
Tinthia mianjangalica Laštuvka, 1997
Tinthia cuprealis (Moore, 1877)
Tinthia ruficollaris (Pagenstecher, 1900)
Tinthia varipes Walker, [1865]
Tinthia xanthospila Hampson, 1919

References

Sesiidae